Mark M. Nakashima (born March 27, 1963) is a Democratic member of the Hawaii House of Representatives. He was first elected in 2008, and represents the first district, including Hamakua, North Hilo, and South Hilo. After obtaining a bachelor's degree in education from the University of Hawaii at Manoa in 1988, he taught at Castle High School and Olomana School's Alder Street Detention Home before transferring back to his alma mater, Honokaa High & Intermediate School. From 1993 until his election to the state legislature, he worked for the Hawaii State Teachers Association, the state affiliate of the National Education Association.

While in office, Nakashima has helped to raise the minimum wage.

References

External links
Legislative homepage
Personal blog

Democratic Party members of the Hawaii House of Representatives
University of Hawaiʻi at Mānoa alumni
People from Hilo, Hawaii
American Buddhists
Living people
1963 births
21st-century American politicians
Hawaii politicians of Japanese descent